Triumph is a 1924 American silent drama film directed by Cecil B. DeMille and starring Leatrice Joy.

Plot
As described in a film magazine review, Anna Land is forewoman of the Garnet Can Works, controlled by William Silver, one of the late owner's sons. Another son, King Garnet, is destitute. Anna's ambition is to be a singer. King extorts $1,000 from Silver and aids Anna in making her debut, which is a success. Silver sends Anna abroad and follows her. She loses her voice as a result of an injury in a fire. King takes a job in the factory and works his way up. On Silver's return, he finds King has obtained control of the company. King makes Silver manager. The latter, knowing Anna really loves his brother, gives her up to King.

Cast

Production
DeMille fell out with Adolph Zukor, one of the heads of Famous Players-Lasky, over the production costs of The Ten Commandments (1923). He completed Triumph and Feet of Clay (1924) before he departed Paramount to lead his own production company, Producers Distributing Corporation (PDC). He returned to Paramount only after the introduction of sound in the early 1930s.

Preservation
Prints of Triumph are held at George Eastman House and the Library of Congress.

References

External links

Theater flier for film at silentfilmstillarchive.com

1924 films
1924 drama films
Silent American drama films
American black-and-white films
American silent feature films
Films directed by Cecil B. DeMille
1920s American films